Raja Dasarathadeva Danujmadhava (Raja Danuaja Rai) was the last known Hindu king of East Bengal.
He was the Deva king of Chandradvipa (present-day Barisal).

History
His ruling kingdom was near the neighborhood of Sonargaon between 1260 and 1268 CE. He later attacked Vikrampur and conquered Sena kingdom before 1280 CE.

See also
 List of rulers of Bengal
 Deva dynasty
 History of Bengal

References

Rulers of Bengal
13th-century Indian people